Choi Moon-soon (born February 4, 1956, Nickname: Moonsoonc) was the governor of Gangwon Province.

Career
After graduating the university, he worked as an investigative journalist of the Munhwa Broadcasting Corporation (MBC) network for almost two decades, and later served as a chief executive officer of MBC from 2005 to 2008, He then served as a Member of the National Assembly from 2008 to 2011. He, with his three generation family, is recognized as an 'elite status of veterans', which certified on the Military Manpower Agency.

Governorship

First term (2011-2014)
He was elected at the special bi-election for the 36th governorship of Gangwon at April 27, 2011. During his first term, he helped to host and prepare the upcoming 2018 Winter Olympics and Paralympics in Pyeongchang county and several venues in Gangwon province, with improving relevant infrastructures such as the construction of new Wonju-Gangneung railway, revitalizing Yangyang International Airport, etc.

Second term (2014-2018)
Choi was re-elected to a second term, on June 4, 2014. His second term, 37th governorship, started on July 1, 2014, with special debate of 'Meeting with Inhabitants', instead of a formal inauguration ceremony. When PyeongChang held the 2018 Winter Olympics and Paralympic games, Choi was given a Paralympic Order.

Third term (2018-present)
Choi was re-elected to a third and last term, on June 13, 2018. His current term, 38th governorship, started on July 1, 2018, a formal inauguration ceremony. He is the first politician Democratic Party or its preceding parties to have served as Gangwon Governor for three times. In January 2020 he successfully recruited 2024 Winter Youth Olympics to Pyeongchang County using the existing facilities built for or used by 2018 Winter Olympics.

Personal life
Choi, a Buddhist, lives in Chuncheon with his wife. He and his wife has 2 daughters. He also has been working as a chairperson of public-owned sports club Gangwon FC, since elected as the provincial governor in 2011.

Education
 Graduated, Chuncheon High School
 Bachelor of Arts, Department of English Education, Kangwon National University
 Master of Arts, Department of English Literature, Seoul National University

See also
 Min Byung-hee, incumbent Superintendent of the Gangwon Provincial Office of Education
 Park Won-soon, Mayor of Seoul, one of his fellow head of metropolitan council.
 Ahn Hee-jung, former Governor of Chungcheongnam-do.
 Ohm Ki-young, rival candidate of 2011 special election; former CEO of MBC(his successor).
 Lee Kwang-jae, 35th Governor of Gangwon (2010-2011); his predecessor, colleague and 2018 Winter Olympics advocate.

References

External links
 Official Gubernatorial Homepage
 Official Weblog, 'Moonsoonc'
 Official Twitter Page

1955 births
Living people
United New Democratic Party politicians
Governors of Gangwon Province
Gangwon FC
Recipients of the Paralympic Order
Munhwa Broadcasting Corporation people
South Korean television executives
Kangwon National University alumni
Seoul National University alumni